The 2021–22 season was the 123rd season in existence of Watford Football Club and their first season back in the Premier League following their immediate return with promotion from the Championship in the previous season. Watford also competed in the FA Cup and EFL Cup.

Managerial changes
On 3 October, the Hornets sacked head coach Xisco. A day later, Claudio Ranieri was appointed the club's new Head Coach, on a two-year contract.

Ranieri was sacked on 24 January and was replaced the following day by Roy Hodgson.

Players

Current squad
As of 22 May 2022

Transfers

Transfers in

Transfers out

Loans in

Loans out

Pre-season and friendlies
Watford announced they would play friendlies against West Bromwich Albion, Stevenage Nantes, and Udinese as part of their pre-season schedule.

Competitions

Premier League

League table

Results summary

Results by matchday

Matches
The league fixtures were announced on 16 June 2021.

FA Cup

Watford were drawn away to Leicester City in the third round.

EFL Cup

Watford entered the competition in the second round and were drawn at home to Crystal Palace and Stoke City in the third round.

Statistics

Appearances

Goalscorers 

The list is sorted by shirt number when total goals are equal.

Clean sheets
The list is sorted by shirt number when total clean sheets are equal.

See also
 2021–22 in English football
 List of Watford F.C. seasons

References

External links

Watford F.C. seasons
Watford F.C.